Boite may refer to:

Boite (river), a river of northern Italy
Valle del Boite, the valley of northern Italy in which the Boite river flows
Pierrier à boîte, an early type of small wrought iron cannon developed in the early 15th century
La Boite Theatre Company, a major Australian theatre company based in Brisbane, Queensland
La Boîte noire, a 2005 French mystery film
Boîte à vendre, a 1951 French comedy film 
Boite mac Cináeda (d. 1058), Scottish prince, son of King Kenneth III of Scotland
Boîte à Bonbons, a 16-CD box set compilation of the recorded songs of Jacques Brel